Christian Raynaud (born 28 April 1946) is a Belgian sports shooter. He competed in the mixed 25 metre rapid fire pistol event at the 1980 Summer Olympics.

References

External links
 

1946 births
Living people
Belgian male sport shooters
Olympic shooters of Belgium
Shooters at the 1980 Summer Olympics
People from Rive-de-Gier
Sportspeople from Loire (department)